Cheer Up, Mr. Lee is a 2019 South Korean comedy-drama film directed by Lee Gae-byok. The film stars Cha Seung-won, Um Chae-young, Park Hae-joon, Kim Hye-ok, Ahn Gil-kang, Jeon Hye-bin and Ryu Han-bi.

Plot
Cheol-Soo (Cha Seung-Won) is physically fit and handsome, but is intellectual disabilities. He finds out that he has a daughter, Saet-Byeol (Um Chae-Young), that he never knew existed.

Cast
 Cha Seung-won as Chul-soo 
 Um Chae-young as Saet-byul
 Park Hae-joon as Young-soo 
 Kim Hye-ok as Saet-byul's grandmother
 Ahn Gil-kang as Mr. Kim 
 Jeon Hye-bin as Eun-hee 
 Ryu Han-bi as Min-jung
 Jo Han-chul as Deok-goo
 Sung Ji-ru as Jeong-kwon
 Ji Yi-soo as Ji-an
 Shin Hyun-bin as Hye-yeong
 Yoo Yeon as Hair Salon owner
 Kim Bup-rae as boss Yang

Production 
Principal photography began on June 23, 2018, and wrapped on September 22, 2018.

References

External links

2019 films
2019 comedy-drama films
South Korean comedy-drama films
Next Entertainment World films
Films about father–daughter relationships
2010s South Korean films